Pauline Charlotte Tratz (born June 14, 1999) is a former German artistic gymnast. Tratz competed at the 2015 World Artistic Gymnastics Championships where she helped her team place 12th. She was an alternate for the German team at the 2016 Summer Olympics, and competed at the 2017 Summer Universiade. She began competing for the UCLA Bruins gymnastics team in the 2018 season.

Personal life
Tratz was born on 14 June 1999 in Karlsruhe to Annette and Matthias Tratz. She has an older brother, Julius. In 2017, Tratz began attending the University of California, Los Angeles where she is currently pursuing a major in communication studies. In 2021, she was named the Pac-12 Women’s Gymnastics Scholar-Athlete of the Year.

Career

Elite

2015 
Tratz started her senior career in 2015. In March, she competed at the Cottbus World Challenge Cup, where she qualified for the vault final and finished fifth. In April, she competed at the 2015 European Artistic Gymnastics Championships, where she qualified for the all-around final and finished 18th. In September, she competed at the German National Championships, winning a silver medal on vault and a bronze medal on floor exercise. In October, she competed at the 2015 World Artistic Gymnastics Championships and helped Germany finish 12th in the team competition.

2016
In March, she competed at the German National Team Cup, where she placed fifth all-around with a score of 51.250 and also won a silver medal on vault. A few weeks later she competed in the DTB-Pokal Team Challenge held in Stuttgart, where she helped her team win a silver medal. After the competition ended she was selected, along with Sophie Scheder, Elisabeth Seitz, Pauline Schäfer, Tabea Alt and Leah Griesser to represent her country at the 2016 Olympic Test Event.

At the Olympic Test Event held in Rio de Janeiro she helped the German team qualify in second place, thus earning one of the final four spots to send a full team to the Games. 

In June, Tratz competed at the German national championships, winning the gold medal on vault and also taking the bronze on the floor exercise. At the German Olympic Trials, Tratz placed ninth in the all around and third on the floor exercise. She was selected as an alternate for the German Olympic team.

On November 10, 2016, Pauline signed a letter of intent to attend UCLA and compete for the Bruin gymnastics team starting with the 2018 season.

2017

In June, Tratz won the gold on vault at the German national championships. In August, before heading to UCLA, she competed at the 2017 Summer Universiade in Taipei. She contributed to the German team’s fourth place finish, and also qualified to the floor exercise and all-around finals, placing fifth and thirteenth respectively.

College 
In the fall of 2017, Tratz began attending the University of California, Los Angeles, joining the gymnastics program for the 2017-2018 season.

As a freshman, Tratz helped the Bruins win the 2018 NCAA Championship, their seventh NCAA team title.

In May 2021, Tratz announced that she will return to UCLA for her fifth season.

Regular season ranking

Competitive history

References

1999 births
Living people
German female artistic gymnasts
Sportspeople from Karlsruhe
UCLA Bruins women's gymnasts
Competitors at the 2017 Summer Universiade
20th-century German women
21st-century German women